Imiliit (Inuktitut syllabics: ᐃᒥᓖᑦ formerly Ragged Island is an uninhabited island, and a member of the Arctic Archipelago in the Qikiqtaaluk Region, Nunavut. Located in Tasiujaq at the mouth of Milne Inlet, it is an irregularly shaped island off the Baffin Island coast.

Another, smaller Ragged Island is found in Chesterfield Inlet, northwest of Big Island.

References 

Islands of Baffin Island
Uninhabited islands of Qikiqtaaluk Region